Bryconidae is a family of fishes belonging to the order Characiformes.

Genera:
 Brycon Müller & Troschel, 1844
 Chilobrycon Géry & de Rham, 1981
 Henochilus Garman, 1890
 Salminus Agassiz, 1829

References

Characiformes
Ray-finned fish families